Yawar may refer to:

Yawar, Papua New Guinea, coastal village in Papua New Guinea
Yawar Rural LLG, subdistrict in Papua New Guinea
Yawar Q'asa
Aristolochia didyma or Yawar Panga, a plant found in South America
Yawar, a given name usually used by Muslims that means "helpful"
Yawar Ziwa, an uthra in Mandaeism

People 
Ghazi Mashal Ajil al-Yawer (born 1958), Iraqi political figure
Yawar Hayat Khan (born 1943)
Yawar Saeed (1935–2015), former Pakistani cricketer
Mian Yawar Zaman (born 1961), Pakistani politician
Ali Yavar Jung (1906–1976), Indian diplomat